The Second School War was a political crisis in Belgium over the issue of religion in education. The conflict lasted between 1950 and 1959 and was ended by a cross-party agreement, known as the School Pact, which clarified the role of religion in the state. It followed a crisis over the same issue in the 19th century, known as the First School War.

Crisis
After victory in the 1950 elections, a Christian Social Party (PSC-CVP) majority government came to power in Belgium for the first time since the end of World War II. The new education minister, Pierre Harmel, used the PSC-CVP's position to increase the wages paid to teachers in private (mainly Roman Catholic) schools and introduced laws linking the subsidies for private schools to the number of pupils. These measures were perceived by the traditionally-anticlerical Liberals and Socialists as a "declaration of war" on the traditionally contentious issue of religion in education.

The 1954 elections reversed the PSC-CVP victory and brought to power a coalition of Socialists and Liberals under Achille Van Acker. The new Education Minister, Leo Collard, immediately set out to reverse the measures taken by Harmel, founding a large number of secular schools and only permitting the instatement of teachers with a diploma, which forced many unqualified priests out of the profession. These measures sparked mass protests from the Catholic bloc. A compromise was eventually reached by the following government (a Catholic minority led by Gaston Eyskens) and the War was concluded by an agreement, known as the School Pact, on 6 November 1958.

School Pact
The School War was finally ended by the "School Pact" (Pacte scolaire or Schoolpact). Under the agreement, parents could choose the system they preferred for their children. Publicly, the pact did not satisfy anyone including many in the Catholic camp, especially the Belgian Cardinal van Roey.

See also

First School War (1879–84)
Royal Question (1944–51)
Belgian general strike of 1960–1961
Roman Catholicism in Belgium

References

Further reading

External links
40 Hurt In Brussels Riot (1955), British Pathé YouTube Channel.

Education in Belgium
Political history of Belgium
History of education in Belgium
Secularism in Belgium
1950s in Belgium
1950 in Belgium
1959 in Belgium